Aglaia brassii is a species of plant in the family Meliaceae. It is found in Australia, West Papua (Indonesia), Papua New Guinea, and the Solomon Islands.

References

brassii
Sapindales of Australia
Flora of Western New Guinea
Flora of Papua New Guinea
Flora of the Solomon Islands (archipelago)
Vulnerable flora of Australia
Nature Conservation Act rare biota
Vulnerable biota of Queensland
Rare flora of Australia
Flora of Queensland
Taxonomy articles created by Polbot